= Superior ramus =

Superior ramus may refer to:

- Superior ramus of the ischium
- Superior pubic ramus
